Horatio Sharpe (1718 – November 9, 1790) was the 22nd proprietary governor of Maryland from 1753 to 1768 under the restored proprietary government of Maryland.

Early life
Horatio Sharpe was born in Hull, Yorkshire, England in 1718 to parents William Sharpe Sr. and Margaret Beake, of Beak Street, Piccadilly in London and Elstree in Hertfordshire.  He was one of 16 children, of whom nine brothers and four sisters survived their father. Sharpe's older brothers were William, John, Nicholas, Joshua, Thomas, Charles, Gregory, and Philip Sharpe. His four sisters were Mary, Elizabeth, Gulielma-Maria and Anne. His brother Gregory Sharpe (1713–1771) was appointed Master of the Temple in 1763 and was chaplain to George III.  His brother William Sharpe of Brocklee Hill, Elstree in Hertfordshire (b. abt 1696 – d. 1767) was clerk of the council.  His brother John Sharpe Esq. of Lincoln's Inn (abt 1700–1756) was Solicitor to the Treasury.

Career
 
He was commissioned in the King's forces in 1745 as a Captain and fought in the Jacobite rising against the Scots.  He served with the 20th Regiment of Foot and the Marines. Later he is found in the West Indies as a Lieutenant-Colonel.  He served until his appointment by Frederick Calvert, 6th Baron Baltimore as the proprietary Maryland colonial governor. (Following Samuel Ogle, who had died.) Horatio Sharpe was the brother of Lord Baltimore's guardian (William).  He arrived in Maryland in August 1753.

Appointed by the King in 1754 as the Royal Commander in Chief of all British Forces and commander of colonial forces for the protection of Virginia and adjoining Colonies, Sharpe was superseded by the arrival Maj. Gen. Edward Braddock in 1755.  Prior to Sharpe's service, Colonel James Innes had commanded all provincial soldiers.

He was a capable civil and military administrator, gentleman-farmer, slave owner, horse collector, hospitable host, and friend of George Mason and George Washington.

Horatio Sharpe also built Whitehall on the outskirts of Annapolis (Whitehall Road, Skidmore, Anne Arundel County). Now a National Historic Landmark, Whitehall was designed by Joseph Horatio Anderson, who was also the architect of the Maryland State House.  It served as Sharpe's residence from the time of his enforced retirement in 1769 until his return to England in 1773.

Between 1760 and 1765, according to a 1912 biography, "The governor spent as much of his time as was possible at Whitehall, amusing himself with his favourite pursuit of farming", with most of the labor provided by slaves:No kinder master could be found, and his large retinue of negro slaves and indentured white servants were supremely happy.  The duty of looking after the welfare and comfort of those under him was faithfully discharged.

Return to England
He returned to England to attend to family matters in 1773 and remained there until his death in 1790. In the Maryland Confiscation Act of 1780, Horatio Sharpe is specifically mentioned by name.  He was encouraged by the new state of Maryland to return from England to Maryland and reclaim his lands.  Barring that, he was permitted to sell or dispose of all his Maryland properties.  Sharpe sold or gave his Maryland properties to his long-time secretary, John Ridout, who had stayed in Maryland during the Revolutionary War to protect his former employer's property.

Sir Robert Eden, 1st Baronet (1741–1784) was the last Royal Governor of Maryland. He followed Horatio Sharpe as governor in 1769.

Death
Sharpe died on November 9, 1790 in Hampstead in London.

Legacy
In 1763, Sharpsburg, Maryland was named in honor of Sharpe by his friend and the town's founder, Joseph Chapline.

See also
 Kingdom of Great Britain

References

External links
Sharpe's correspondence. From The Archives of Maryland
.
 

1718 births
1790 deaths
People from Kingston upon Hull
Lancashire Fusiliers officers
Royal Marines officers
Colonial Governors of Maryland
British emigrants to the Thirteen Colonies